Governor Robertson may refer to:

Daniel Robertson (colonial administrator) (1813–1892), Acting Governor of the Gambia in 1859 and 1861
James B. A. Robertson (1871–1938), 4th Governor of Oklahoma
James Robertson (British Army officer) (1717–1788), 40th British Governor of New York from 1779 to 1783
James Wilson Robertson (1899–1983), 2nd Governor-General of Nigeria from 1955 to 1960
Thomas B. Robertson (1779–1828), 3rd Governor of Louisiana
William Charles Fleming Robertson (1867–1937), Governor of Barbados from 1925 to 1932
Wyndham Robertson (1803–1888), Acting Governor of Virginia  from 1836 to 1837